Skelbrooke is a small village in the Metropolitan Borough of Doncaster, South Yorkshire, England. It is in the civil parish of Hampole, which had a population of 187.

The Grade II listed church of St Michael and All Angels is of medieval origin, but was rebuilt in 1872 following fire damage. There are also two Grade II listed medieval grave slabs near the church, and Skelbrooke Hall with its gate piers as well as a house that once formed part of an 18th-century stable block are likewise listed buildings.

See also
Listed buildings in Hampole

References

External links
 Skelbrooke in the Domesday Book

Villages in Doncaster